The Shredder is a supervillain and the main antagonist of the Teenage Mutant Ninja Turtles media franchise created by Kevin Eastman and Peter Laird. The character first appeared in the comic book Teenage Mutant Ninja Turtles #1 in May 1984, and has since endured as the archenemy of the turtles and their rat sensei Splinter.

The Shredder is usually depicted as the alter ego of Oroku Saki, the ruthless leader of a criminal ninja organization known as the Foot Clan. A suit of armor equipped with metal blades and tekko-kagi, loosely based on that of a samurai, serves as the Shredder's visual motif.

In 2009, IGN ranked Shredder as the 39th-greatest comic book villain of all time. The character has been featured in almost every media adaptation of the TMNT franchise, having been portrayed in live-action films by James Saito, François Chau, Tohoru Masamune, and Brian Tee. James Avery, Scottie Ray, Kevin Michael Richardson and Hoon Lee have provided his voice in animation.

Concept and creation
Kevin Eastman got the idea for the Shredder's armor from large trapezoidal cheese graters which he envisioned on a villainous character's arms. He then said, "Could you imagine a character with weapons on his arms like this?" Peter Laird suggested the name The Shredder. Although Shredder is often depicted as the main antagonist in the Ninja Turtles franchise, it was never the creators' intention to be the case in his original inception in the Mirage Comics:

Comic books

Mirage and Image

Oroku Saki

In the original comic books from Mirage Comics, Oroku Saki is the younger brother of Oroku Nagi, who had been killed by a fellow ninja Hamato Yoshi (the owner of Splinter, the Turtles' mentor) in a feud over a woman named Tang Shen, resulting in Yoshi fleeing with Shen to the United States.

Angry at the death of his older brother, Saki joined the Foot Clan and trained to be a ninja. He quickly became one of their deadliest warriors and rose up the ranks and was chosen to lead the Foot's American branch. Operating in New York under the name of The Shredder, Saki used the opportunity to avenge his brother by killing Yoshi and Shen. Under Saki's leadership, the Foot participated in variety of criminal activities, including drug smuggling, arms running, and assassination.

Thirteen years later Saki was challenged by the Ninja Turtles, who were the result of an accident exposing four ordinary turtles to radioactive waste. They were trained by Yoshi's pet rat Splinter, who had also been mutated by the same substance, to avenge his former master. After a lengthy rooftop battle where Saki seemed to be winning, Leonardo managed to plunge his sword through Saki's torso. Defeated, he was offered the opportunity to commit seppuku (ritual suicide), but Shredder refused and detonated a thermite grenade, in an attempt to take their lives alongside his own. But at the last second, Donatello used his bo to knock Shredder off the building to his death.

However, it was not yet the end of the Shredder. He returned on Christmas Eve seemingly resurrected with an army of Foot Ninjas severely beating Leonardo and burning down the apartment of the turtles' ally April O'Neil, forcing them to go into hiding outside the city.

A year later, in the story "Return to New York", the Turtles returned to settle the score with the Shredder. Leonardo faced off against Oroku Saki alone, during which Saki revealed he was brought back to life by a technique using worms feeding on his remains and recreating his cells to reform his body. The same technique was also used to create the Shredder Clones. In the battle, Leonardo decapitates the villain, finally killing him, and the four turtles burn his body at the Hudson River.

Tales of the TMNT
In the second volume of the anthology series Tales of the Teenage Mutant Ninja Turtles story "Worms of Madness" it is shown that a few weeks after the events of their final battle the Shredder had yet another resurrection of sorts when a Foot Mystic reactivated the worms. However, the Foot Mystic did not resurrect Saki himself but the worm colony which had gained sentience and retained Saki's memories and believing itself to be Saki. The worms then went out to find a new body and chose that of a shark. After the Foot kidnapped Splinter, the turtles managed to engage the "Shredder-Shark" in battle, defeating it by severing its connection to the mystic at which point the creature realized that it was not the real Saki.

The "Shredder-Shark" returned once more kidnapping Casey Jones's adopted daughter Shadow to lure the Turtles into a trap. With the Turtles away, it was up to Casey and Splinter to defeat it and rescue Shadow, finally killing the creature.

Other versions of the Shredder
Throughout a considerable part of the Image comic series, Raphael tries to impersonate Shredder by wearing his armor. Following this, he is accepted as the leader of the Foot Clan. In later issues of the series, a mysterious Lady Shredder appears to challenge Raphael. Although the book was canceled before her identity could be revealed, writer Gary Carlson confirmed after the fact that she was meant to be Karai. The female ninja Pimiko from series claims to be Shredder's daughter.

In Volume Four series, Leonardo encounters Oroku Yoshi, a Battle Nexus contestant wearing armor almost identical to that of the second animated series' Shredder. His connection to Oroku Saki and the Foot is not known, since the bi-monthly comic was ultimately cancelled in 2010. In issue 32 he was called to meet a mysterious individual who asks to bring Leo with him as well.

Archie Comics
The Archie Comics' series use the same background as the 1987 cartoon, as the first issues are identical. Later in the Archie comics, Shredder travels to the future and works with Armaggon and Verminator X to offset the skill and experience of the future versions of the Turtles.

This version of the character was more in line with the early episodes' depiction of the character as a cunning adversary and in many issues nearly proves to be a lethal enemy, coming close to defeating the turtles on a number of occasions, even aiding Armaggon and Verminator X in the defeat and capture of two of the turtles in the future. However he shows some amount of honour in the comic. His final fate within the Archie comics series remains unknown, though a three-part mini-series put out by Archie comics after the end of their regular comic series seems to indicate he remains a consistent foe to the turtles for many years, briefly restoring Splinter to the form of Hamato Yoshi and also undoing Michaelangelo's mutation, though both later revert to mutant status by the end of the story, while Shredder was left in a vegetative state in the aftermath of his final battle with the Turtles.

IDW Publishing
In feudal Japan, Oroku Saki was a high-ranking member of the Foot Clan along with Hamato Yoshi. While Yoshi focused on his family, Saki surpassed him and was promoted to Jonin (leader) of the Foot. After an argument on his style of leadership, Saki sent ninja to murder Yoshi's wife, Tang Shen, and later Yoshi and his four sons.

With the help of Kitsune, Saki steals regenerative ooze from an Utrom known as "The Iron Demon" (later revealed to be Krang himself) which is used to preserve his body until he is awakened by his descendant Oroku Karai several centuries later in modern-day New York. During his time in stasis, his spirit conquered the realm of the Afterlife, where he learned he was destined to rule the earth world and eventually return to the Afterlife as a lost soul. Knowing the future, he vows to change it by conquering the realm of the Afterlife upon his return.

Shredder first appears in Micro-series #1 and in full costume on the final page of issue #9. Dan Duncan first designed Shredder with input from Mateus Santolouco and Kevin Eastman; originally wanting to depict a "beefy...monster" he decided to simplify the design and slimmed down the character based on the original Mirage design.

Seeking control in his forthcoming battle for power, Shredder offers Splinter a place in his army but Splinter refuses, revealing himself to be a reincarnated Hamato Yoshi. Saki then reveals his own identity and attacks Splinter, almost killing him when the Turtles arrive to rescue their father. Impressed by Leonardo, he orders his capture and conducts a plan involving kidnapping and stabbing Casey Jones. Shredder then has Kitsune brainwash Leonardo to become his new Chunin (second-in-command) and uses him for a show of strength to the criminal underworld. After the Turtles rescue Leonardo, Shredder calls a meeting with Krang and proposes an alliance in exchange for Utrom technologies, which Krang rejects. A short battle results in retreat on both sides and the revelation that Shredder had stolen some Utrom resources from Krang's compound to begin creating a mutant army (in the form of Bebop, Rocksteady, Koya and Bludgeon).

In Issue #50, Shredder faced Splinter and the turtles in a final battle which he lost and briefly admitted his faults and also making Karai the new head of the Foot Clan in the event of his death. Splinter then retaliated by slashing deep into the back of his head with his sword, killing Shredder instantly.

After his death, Shredder's body is kept in a crypt that is guarded by Jennika who was assigned by Hamato Yoshi in order to learn humility. Shredder's tomb is eventually desecrated by the witch Kitsune who plans to revive Oroku Saki in order to restore order to the Foot Clan but Splinter knew this and keeps the skull to foil her attempts.

Shredder will appear in the upcoming miniseries Shredder in Hell. In the mini-series, Shredder is in the afterlife and descends into the underworld trying to find the truth of his own soul meanwhile Kitsune uses his corpse to summon her father as his host. Shredder also fought his past life Takeshi Tasuo in his inner conflict until Splinter/Hamato Yoshi later shows up to help him against the forces of Hell.

At the time when Mutant Town was established when Old Hob detonated a mutagen bomb the day when Baxter Stockman became the Mayor of New York City, Oroku Saki resurfaces and saves April from some mutant eels that were offspring of the Slithery.

Saki later appears in Old Hob's lair, where Old Hob and Man Ray do not recognize him. He frees the weasel children and disappears when he sees Raphael approaching.

As Raphael takes the time to reminisce about Splinter, Saki watches him from afar.

Television

1987 animated series

In the 1987 animated series, Oroku Saki and Hamato Yoshi were both members of the Foot Clan in Japan. After Saki framed him for the attempted murder of a visiting sensei, Yoshi was forced to exile himself to New York City, where he lived in the sewers with four pet turtles that were accidentally dropped down a storm drain.

In the following years, Saki took leadership of the Foot Clan and took on his Shredder persona. He also met a trans-dimensional alien called Krang and used the advanced technology at his disposal to replace the Foot Ninja with robots called the Foot Soldiers. He secretly moved to New York, where he found Yoshi still alive. In an attempt to kill his old foe, Shredder dumped mutagen in the sewers. This mutates Yoshi into Splinter, and he starts training the also mutated Turtles in ninjutsu. After the Turtles discovered their operation in New York City, Shredder became their enemy and would stop at nothing until they were defeated, often holding the Turtles' human ally April O'Neil captive as bait. In one episode, Shredder was accidentally hit by his lasted weapon that made him think he was pals with the Turtles as he thought he was Michelangelo. However, Shredder was hypnotized by Splinter into going between his real personality and Michelangelo whenever he would hear their names. Although, after being hit again, Shredder was back to his old self, which might have undone the hypnosis.

Shredder was voiced by James Avery for seasons one to seven and William E. Martin for seasons eight and ten, with the alternates being Dorian Harewood and Pat Fraley in 1989, Jim Cummings in 1991–1993 and Townsend Coleman in 1993. In the 2009 crossover movie Turtles Forever, the 1987 version of the Shredder was voiced by Load Williams. In the 2012 series, the 1987 version of the Shredder is voiced by Kevin Michael Richardson due to the death of James Avery in 2013.

Depiction
In his early appearances, Shredder was presented as extremely cunning and was described by Splinter himself as the most dangerous adversary he ever faced. Shredder's intelligence persevered throughout his various portrayals, and in several instances, it is claimed that Shredder has an IQ of 300. As the 1987 cartoon series was more light-hearted than the comics, Shredder was later depicted as evil but a villain that always fails rather than the dire and lethal ninja he was originally shown to be. He and Krang are constantly bickering about tactics and often take pleasure in the other's failings (and sometimes intentionally sabotage each other). His two henchmen Bebop and Rocksteady are especially incompetent and fail miserably at everything they do. They were mostly used for comic relief in the show; however, the Turtles certainly consider them to be formidable (despite their inane stupidity) in combat due to their great strength and endurance, and as such, often use their intelligence to outwit them.

Despite Shredder's failings, he is still shown to have considerable skills. In martial arts, he is often shown to surpass the Turtles and to be equaled only by Splinter. Nevertheless, he usually runs away from a fight when outnumbered, incapacitating the Turtles to defeat them in combat; as the series progressed, however, the Turtles were able to battle him on more equal grounds and even defeat him in combat on several occasions. He trained the Punk Frogs in a very short period of time to be a match for the Turtles, but the Punk Frogs soon switch sides. His technical skills are also quite impressive: he designed and built a robotic body for Krang, prepared the mutagen mixture, knew how Krang's teleportation engine worked and built numerous other advanced devices. Ironically in one episode "Shredderville" the Turtles dream they find themselves in a mirror universe where they themselves never existed and Shredder rules New York City, yet finds the task of ruling so burdensome that he has a nervous breakdown.

From mid-season seven onwards, Shredder was depicted as a more serious threat, full of anger and bloodlust, though he was still easily defeated by the Turtles. His friendship with Krang also appeared to have grown. There were many times that Shredder could have just left Krang at the mercy of the Turtles or Lord Dregg, but he always rescued him and went as far as to donate his life energy to save him.

Family
Shredder's family is presented in three episodes. In the episode "Shredder's Mom", Shredder's mother Miyoko helps Shredder and Krang in an attempt to destroy the world's climate. In this episode, Miyoko first learns of her son's criminal activities and proves herself to be villainous. However, she constantly treats Shredder like a baby, until he gets fed up with it and transports her back to her retirement home. In the episode "My Brother, the Bad Guy", it is revealed that Oroku Saki has a younger brother, Kazuo who works as a police lieutenant in Tokyo. Kazuo and the Turtles try to join forces to stop one of Shredder's plans, but his fervent respect for the law clashes with the Turtles' "whatever it takes" attitude. Finally, the episode "The Legend of Koji" features Saki's distant ancestor Oroku Sancho, who lived in Japan in 1583. He is the leader of a small clan, and every bit as wicked as his descendant. When Shredder offers to help him find magical relics that would provide him with power and wealth, Sancho takes Shredder's information, then betrays him and orders his men to kill him. However, Sancho is also a coward, and when he breaks down in the face of danger, his men abandon him.

This family tree leads to a bit of confusion regarding whether Shredder's given name is Oroku and his last name Saki (as indicated by the fact his brother shares the name Saki), or the other way around (as indicated by the fact his ancestor's last name is Oroku). This question is never resolved on the show, although Mirage comics adds more evidence for Oroku being the family name; Saki's brother is "Oroku Nagi". This follows Japanese naming conventions, which place the family name before an individual's given name.

Timeline
Counting from the first meeting with the Turtles, Shredder spent eight seasons plotting ways to defeat them. In the season 8 episode "Turtle Trek", the Turtles destroy the engines of the Technodrome, trapping it and its inhabitants in Dimension X for good and putting an end to Shredder's plans. He spent the next two seasons in Dimension X, until he was contacted by Dregg ("The Power of Three"). Dregg arranged for him and Krang to come back to Earth, to help him fight the Turtles. Together, they capture the Turtles, but Dregg then betrays them and tries to drain the life energy of the Turtles, Krang, and Shredder all at once, making them weaker while Dregg becomes stronger. Shredder alone escapes the trap and restores Krang ("A Turtle in Time"), but Dregg captures them again. Finally, the Turtles spoil Dregg's plan and transport Shredder and Krang back to Dimension X ("Turtles to the Second Power"). In the series finale "Divide and Conquer", the Turtles return to the Technodrome in Dimension X to take Krang's android body, which they need to fight Dregg. Shredder is nowhere to be seen, but it is assumed that he is still somewhere in Dimension X.

He and Krang also appear in Turtles Forever, with the Technodrome still under New York City before being sent into the 2003 universe. However, Shredder and Krang's incompetence (as well as their relative sanity) is fully shown when the Utrom Shredder of the 2003 universe seizes command of the Technodrome and adds Utrom technology to the powerful war machine, and turns it against the world. In the climax, Shredder temporarily overcomes his hatred for the Turtles as both he and Krang decide to help the Turtles defeat the Utrom Shredder who they realize is totally insane, will kill everyone, and has effectively stolen the Technodrome from them. Shredder also takes extreme offense at being considered inferior by his other-dimensional counterpart, does not see the point of destroying the entire universe, and does not understand why the Utrom Shredder refuses to just kill the Turtles when he has the chance. So, with Krang, he chooses to fight alongside the Turtles against their common foe.

The Next Mutation
In Ninja Turtles: The Next Mutation, Shredder (portrayed by Patrick Pon, voiced by Doug Parker) is still the Turtles' sworn enemy. This time, however, Venus uses her powers to make the Oroku Saki from within taking control of Shredder's mind. After the Foot Clan disbands, he ends up living on the streets. Later, the Dragon Lord's rank warriors attack him to get a medallion that was in his possession. Splinter saves him and takes him to the Turtles' lair to protect him. It was hinted that Shredder might possibly go back to his old ways, but the show was canceled soon after that episode.

In the show, Shredder wore a general attire similar to the one he wore in the second film, but with a heavily altered helmet/mask due to the lesser budget for the TV series as compared to the movies, which had allowed for more detailed props and costume pieces. Shredder appeared only a few times in the show, due to the main antagonist of the series being a draconic being from another dimension and thus supplanted Shredder as the Turtles' nemesis.

2003 animated series
Various individuals have assumed the mantle of the Shredder in the 2003 animated series, all of whom, except for Karai, are voiced by Scottie Ray, and are considered as the most vile and ruthless incarnations of the character in the entire franchise. In the episode "Tempus Fugit", a possible future is shown in which the Utrom Shredder, Tengu Shredder and Cyber Shredder are engaged in a war for control of New York City.

Utrom Shredder

The Utrom Shredder is the main antagonist and the primary Shredder of the series. He serves as the archenemy of the Turtles and Splinter, and indirectly had a hand in their creation.

Ch'rell (whose aliases include Torrinon, Kako Naso and Duke Acureds) is a megalomaniacal and psychopathic Utrom warlord responsible for the deaths of millions across the universe. Although he was captured by his fellow Utroms, Ch'rell escaped and caused their ship to crash-land on earth during the Sengoku period of feudal Japan. The stranded Utroms built humanoid exosuits to disguise themselves among the humans. Ch'rell stole the first working prototype and used the Japanese legend of a Demon Tengu to craft a dual identity, becoming a wealthy Japanese philanthropist named Oroku Saki and a ruthless crime lord known as the Shredder. He founded an underground criminal empire called the Foot Clan to hunt down his former Utrom captors and later adopted an abandoned girl named Karai, whom he personally trained in ninjutsu to lead the Foot Clan in Japan while he moved to New York City to expand their operation. Shredder created important links with the New York underworld, enlisting Hun, the leader of the Purple Dragons, as his right-hand man. In New York, Shredder captures Hamato Yoshi, one of the Utroms' foremost guardians, and kills him after he refuses to reveal their location. Yoshi's pet rat Splinter witnesses his murder and escapes, winding up in the city's sewers where he and four baby turtles are accidentally exposed to a mutagenic ooze created by the Utroms, transforming them into sentient humanoid lifeforms.

In the first season set over a decade later, the Turtles begin encountering the Foot Clan and unknowingly foiling several of the Shredder's operations. Oroku Saki becomes intrigued with the Turtles, wanting to meet them and hoping to bring them to his side. One day, he invites Leonardo to his home and offers him to join the Foot. However, the Turtles learn of his true nature when Splinter tells them about the Shredder's role in Master Yoshi's murder. The Shredder eventually becomes the greatest enemy of the Turtles when they reject his offer. During their first engagement, the Shredder proves himself to be more skilled than the Turtles, compelling them to flee and hide. While Shredder and his Foot Ninja search for the Turtles, Splinter finds and regroups them, and plans a counterattack. In a subsequent battle on the rooftops, the Shredder outmatches the Turtles again, but Splinter tricks him into cutting the support for a water tower, which is kicked onto him. The water sweeps Shredder off the building, and the tower collapses to the ground, crushing him. But a few scenes later, Shredder's hand emerges from the wreckage of the water tower.

Splinter and the Turtles were unaware of the Shredder's survival until months later, one day when Leonardo goes on an outdoor morning training exercise, only to be ambushed by the Foot Clan. He is beaten close to death and sent flying into a window of April O'Neil's antique shop apartment, where the Turtles were staying after Foot Ninjas had marauded their sewer home while they were away. Soon afterward, the Shredder leads an assault on April's shop. Overpowered and outnumbered, the Turtles, Splinter, April, and Casey Jones are forced to retreat in a walk-in cooler. The Shredder then burns down the apartment, but the Turtles and their allies evacuate and depart for Casey's grandmother's farmhouse, where they would spend the next three months recuperating.

During this time, they are presumed dead, but Saki orders Baxter Stockman to find evidence that the Turtles died, and is cheated by Stockman into believing so. When Leonardo is completely healed from his injuries, the Turtles and Splinter return to New York to face the Shredder once more. They launch a surprise assault on the Foot headquarters, fighting their way through Shredder's minions and eventually reaching his throne. By the end of the battle, Leonardo decapitates The Shredder when they strike each other in one final clash. Not knowing that he is an Utrom, the Turtles believe him to be finally killed for good. After they leave, the Shredder is seen to be getting up and walking away carrying his severed head.

In the second season, Ch'rell seeks to exact revenge on his species. He infiltrates the TCRI facility, where the Utroms' base is located and encounters the Turtles and Master Splinter. Despite their efforts, an unconscious Shredder slips out a time bomb, set to detonate in ten minutes. The Turtles help the Utroms escape using the Transmat, a teleportation device, which Donatello activates. After the Utroms teleport back to their homeworld, the Shredder awakens and attacks the Turtles. In the ensuing fight, the Turtles use their weapons to penetrate his armor, which is then shocked by Donatello, disabling it. Afterward, the Shredder reveals his Utrom form to the Turtles, intent on taking down his enemies with him. However, in the last few seconds, Donatello manages to power up the Transmat, through which he, his brothers, and Splinter escape before the TCRI building implode with Ch'rell inside of it.

With his supposed demise, the Foot Clan, the Purple Dragons, and the New York Mafia clash with each other for control of New York City. Unknown to them, the Shredder had survived once more and was retrieved by his daughter Karai, now being placed in a stasis tube and healed by worms inside a secret medical facility of the Foot headquarters. During his recuperation, Karai assumes leadership of the Foot Clan and makes peace with the Turtles after they help her end the turf war. However, once the Shredder is fully recovered, he vows vengeance and breaks off the truce. By this point, Baxter Stockman had created the Foot Mechs, mainly in the form of armed ninja robots, but in versions of the U.S. president, the English Prime Minister, and Splinter as well. The Shredder's plans were again thwarted when the Turtles, Splinter, and their unlikely ally, the Triceraton Zog, locate his barge hideout, leading to another confrontation with the Foot. Aboard the freighter, Donatello programs a bomb set to go off in 30 minutes. The Shredder is defeated again when Zog sacrifices himself by seizing him and jumping into a blazing fire, but Karai rescues him on a helicopter.

In the third season, the Triceratons launch an invasion on Earth. In the aftermath of the invasion, New York City is in ruins. In his persona as Oroku Saki, the Shredder uses his fortune to repair the damage and gains the favor of its citizens, while secretly salvaging the remnants of Triceraton technology to construct a large starship to return to the stars, so he could retaliate against the Utrom. He also promotes Karai to lieutenant and enlists the help of a young scientist named Dr. Chaplin, replacing Hun and Stockman due to their numerous failures. The craft is eventually completed, but Ch'rell's plan suffers several complications, courtesy of the Turtles and the Earth Protection Force (led by Agent Bishop). Despite sustaining heavy damage, the ship is launched into orbit, albeit with the Turtles and Splinter on board. When Karai notes that they left their forces on Earth, Ch'rell states that he has allies on other worlds that can help him. Entering a four-armed Shredder exo-suit, Ch'rell easily defeats them all, prompting the Turtles and Splinter to attempt to sacrifice their lives and blow the ship up in a final attempt to stop the Shredder. Luckily, as the starship explodes, Mortu and the Utrom arrive, having placed a stasis field around the entire ship, freezing time, and teleport all its inhabitants to safety. While the Turtles and Splinter are teleported to the infirmary and Professor Honeycutt is taken to one of their labs to be placed in a new robot body, Ch'rell, Karai, and Dr. Chaplin are teleported to the brig. On the Utrom homeworld, Ch'rell is placed on trial before the Utrom High Council that is observed by the Turtles, Splinter, Karai, and Professor Honeycutt. The Utrom High Council lists his crimes from launching an attack on the planet Enefgold where over one million innocents perished, incited and funded a civil war on the planet Eno II in an effort to mine their raw minerals without restriction in which 3.2 million perished, and multiple attempts to take control of the Utrom government through an illegal and violent coup. The Utrom High Council then finds Ch'rell guilty for the chaos and destruction he brought across the universe and ultimately sentence him to eternal exile on the desolate ice asteroid Mor Gal Tal.

In the finale film Turtles Forever, Ch'rell is freed from his exile by his Shredder counterpart from the 1987 series after his frozen body was teleported off of Mor Gal Tal by the 1980s Shredder and Krang. Once Karai showed up upon finding out about Ch'rell's return, Ch'rell then takes over the Technodrome and gains a new, more powerful exo-suit. After realigning with a now-mutated Hun, Ch'rell reverse-engineers the mutagen that Hun got to turn a select number of Cyber Foot into Mutant Foot Soldiers and create new Foot Robots that are stronger than the '80s versions. The Ch'rell later uses the Technodrome to view alternate dimensions, realizing that there is an entire multiverse of Ninja Turtles. Locating the Turtles' source planet, Turtle Prime, Ch'rell vows to eliminate every Ninja Turtle in existence by destroying this dimension. The Mirage Turtles, the 1987 Turtles, and the 2003 Turtles team up to defeat Ch'rell, though Karai and Splinter agree that the Shredder will return again as he always does.

In "Same As It Never Was", Donatello is transported to an alternate future in which the Shredder has succeeded in subjugating Earth. By then, Splinter had died protecting his sons and Casey Jones died fighting the Foot Clan. Ch'rell also severed Michelangelo's left arm and Raphael's left eye. When Donatello leads a final rebellion against the Shredder's fortress, his Foot forces kill Michelangelo while Karai kills Leonardo and Raphael. April avenges Leonardo and Raphael by using a rocket launcher on Karai, and the Shredder is killed by Donatello with the Tuneller.

In "Timing is Everything", Leonardo and Cody Jones are accidentally sent back in time to the aftermath of the Turtles' first battle with the Shredder. Later, the Shredder and several Foot ninjas are transported to 2105 but are easily defeated by the Turtles' futuristic technology.

Karai
Karai is the adopted daughter of the Utrom Shredder. She takes on the mantle of the Shredder and continues her father's legacy following his exile, though she later renounces the title and begins a non-hostile relationship with the Turtles.

Tengu Shredder
The original Shredder was a demonic Tengu from hell that terrorized ancient Japan. On the verge of death after being defeated by the Five Dragon warriors, it made a deal with Oroku Saki; if Saki allowed the demon to enter and possess him, he would gain all of its power. Saki became the next Shredder but his reign of terror ended when his former comrades, now the Ninja Tribunal, captured and entombed him. The Tengu Shredder is only resurrected centuries later by his five mystic heralds, forcing the Ninja Tribunal to recruit the Turtles and all of their allies to stand against him. Karai uses a mystic link shared by all who take on the mantle of the Shredder to weaken the demon, allowing the Turtles to summon the spirit of Hamato Yoshi and deliver the final blow, destroying the Tengu Shredder once and for all.

Cyber Shredder
The Cyber Shredder is an artificial intelligence and a digital copy of Ch'rell created in the event of his demise. The futuristic Viral accidentally releases this copy of Ch'rell's consciousness, creating the Cyber Shredder. While he is initially confined to cyberspace, the Cyber Shredder ultimately manages to escape and become a physical being. In the final episode of the series, he leads the Foot Clan in an attack on April O'Neil and Casey Jones's wedding. The Cyber Shredder is finally destroyed when the Turtles erase him with a de-compiler previously used against Viral.

2012 animated series
The Shredder appears in the 2012 animated series, voiced by Kevin Michael Richardson.

His Japanese origins as Oroku Saki and brotherly relationship with Hamato Yoshi is mostly intact, with the Foot Clan and the Hamato Clan being later revealed as having a long-term rivalry before the Hamato family killed the Oroku family, wiped out their entire clan (starting with the destruction of the Foot Clan monastery) and took in the orphaned Saki as their own. Despite being raised as brothers, both Saki and Yoshi eventually became rivals due to the love of Tang Shen, whose decision to marry Yoshi drove Saki to discover his true heritage and turn on his former brother, eventually destroying everything Yoshi held dear, including Tang Shen (whom he had killed by accident) and the entire Hamato Clan (starting with the destruction of the Hamato Clan monastery, which resulted with Saki's head getting burned scarred and hairless). Blaming Tang Shen's untimely death on Yoshi, Saki returned to his biological family and became the new leader of the newly restored Foot Clan, tutoring ninjutsu students such as world-famous martial artist Chris Bradford and Brazilian street thug Xever Montes, sharing criminal business with business partners such as Russian arms dealer Ivan Steranko, Sicilian mob boss Don Visiozo, and Purple Dragons leader Hun. In addition, he also a pet akita named Hachiko (named after the akita of the same name) who played a part in Bradford's mutation into Dogpound after Hachiko bit him. Shredder began wearing the Kuro Kabuto, a helmet that served as his symbol of power over the Foot Clan.

Shredder first appeared at the end of "Rise of the Turtles, Part 2" where he traveled to New York when he learned that Hamato Yoshi is training his own ninjas after seeing a shuriken with his clan symbol on a shuriken left behind by the Turtles during a recent fight on a TV news report. Determined to finally end his age-old rival's life, he sent the Foot Clan after the Turtles until he made his first confrontation with the Turtles in person in "The Gauntlet", where victory was seemingly in his grasp before he was distracted by the mutating Bradford and Montes. Although Shredder planned to kill former TCRI inventor Baxter Stockman for interfering with his plans to kill the Turtles in "MOUSERS Attack", he changed his mind by commenting on how Stockman's scientific knowledge could be useful to him. Shredder is also Karai's father, as seen in "New Girl in Town". However, in "Showdown", during Shredder's battle with Splinter, he reveals that in the aftermath of the fight that caused Tang Shen's death, he took Splinter's daughter, Miwa, and raised her as Karai. He has told her that he is her biological father and it was Splinter who killed her mother, as she has sworn revenge ever since. Shredder initially dismissed the Kraang's presence in New York, but after capturing one, decided to ally with them to destroy the Turtles. The partnership seems stable, though it would seem the Shredder still did not fully trust his new allies.

Early in the second season, in "Follow the Leader", he left for Japan to deal with a situation, leaving Karai as the interim leader of his Foot Clan. He ordered her not to attack the Turtles nor make any dealings with the Kraang behind his back and was livid when his adoptive daughter disobeyed him. He returned in "The Manhattan Project", with Tiger Claw, a Japanese circus performer who was mutated into Shredder's deadly assassin and new first lieutenant. Tiger Claw was able to bring Splinter before him, but complications from a Kraang operation in the city and the Turtles' own efforts rob Shredder of his chance to kill his old foe once again. In "The Wrath of Tiger Claw", Shredder and Tiger Claw attempted to use Karai to set a trap for the Turtles, but when she saw a photograph of Hamato Yoshi, Tang Shen, and herself as an infant, she realized that the Turtles were telling the truth and sided with them, resulting in her being captured while buying them time to escape Tiger Claw. Shredder still cared about his adoptive daughter, though, as seen in "The Legend of the Kuro Kabuto", where he visited her in her cell and explained why he kept everything a secret and hoped that she will one day understand. In "Vengeance is Mine", Shredder attempted to use Karai as bait for a trap that would mutate the Turtles into snakes that would kill Splinter, but the plan backfired when Karai was exposed to the mutagen, turning into a snake and almost attacking Splinter before she fled after regaining control of herself.

In the two-part second-season finale "The Invasion", Shredder and Kraang Prime formed a full alliance in which Shredder and the Foot Clan will help the Kraang take over New York and then the world, and in turn, the Kraang would return Karai to normal, and deliver Splinter and the Turtles to him. Shredder subsequently injured Leo and fought Splinter and Leatherhead, defeating the pair and seemingly killing the former. During the Kraang occupation of the city, Shredder conscripted Steranko and Zeck as new mutant members of his clan and had them recapture Karai for him. The Kraang invasion eventually was defeated by the Turtles and the Mighty Mutanimals, and Shredder uses the chaos of post-invasion New York to take firm control of the city's criminal underworld, using his connections to gather materials for a mind-control serum that he planned to create and use on the Turtles, the Mutanimals, and Karai. Though he successfully brainwashed Karai to return to his side, she overcame the treatment and fled again. In the two-part season 3 finale, Annihilation: Earth! he briefly teams up with Splinter to stop a black hole machine that was to destroy the Earth. He briefly fought the Triceratons until he followed Splinter, double-crossing and stabbing him in the back, killing him instantly in front of the turtles. Proclaiming that his victory over Splinter is more important to him than even saving the world, Shredder is sucked into the black hole along with his followers and Splinter while the turtles, April and Casey escape Earth's destruction. In "Beyond the Known Universe", the Turtles travel back in time to six months earlier in an effort to prevent this event from happening. In "Earth's Last Stand" these events were revisited, but the arrival of the Turtles from the future resulted in Shredder's attempt to murder Splinter being thwarted. The two engaged briefly in battle with Splinter proving victorious, and the unconscious Shredder was carried away by Tiger Claw.

A critically injured Shredder ordered Stockman to mutate him to give him the power needed to exact his revenge. In "The Super Shredder", the Shredder mutates into his Super Shredder form, becoming a far more powerful opponent for the Turtles and their allies. In "Requiem", he returns to New York City and faces off against Splinter, Slash, Raphael, April, and Casey. He ultimately manages to murder Splinter, whom he hurls from the building to his death. In the season four finale "Owari" he has his lackeys prepare for the inevitable arrival of the Turtles, April, and Casey. He burns down his new lair and confronts the Turtles in a final showdown on the roof. His unique mutation makes him immune to Donatello's retro-mutagen, which allows him to beat Raphael, Donatello, and Michelangelo all at once, leaving only Leonardo left standing. After a heated one-on-one duel, Shredder is finally killed by Leonardo.

Many months later, the Kabuto and his own heart were separated by unknown means and hidden in secret locations throughout New York. His heart was contained within a glass vial that came into the possession of Don Vzioso, which Tiger Claw and a demodragon named Kavaxas seek, as it is essential to revive him and then came back in a zombie-like form that was later revealed to be under Kavaxas’ control. But thanks to Michelangelo's quick thinking and some chewed gum, Zombie Shredder was able to drag Kavaxas back to the Netherworld as they "[did] not belong here" in the mortal world.

2018 animated series

Shredder appears in Rise of the Teenage Mutant Ninja Turtles, voiced by Hoon Lee.

500 years before the series, Oroku Saki was the leader of the peaceful Foot Clan and father of the Hamato Clan founder, Karai, whose soul was swallowed by the demonic and nigh-unstoppable Kuroi Yōroi armor after it was forged by a powerful Oni (in reality the alien Krang). After being transformed into the Shredder, Saki led the Foot down a path of darkness, enslaving many villages and slaying many innocent lives in the process. With no other choice, Karai was forced to create her own clan, the Hamato Clan, to end the demon's reign of terror. Shredder terrorized Japan until he was defeated by Karai using her mystic Hamato Ninpō energy (since no mortal weapon could harm Shredder) to send him into a dimension called the Twilight Realm, and the Kuroi Yōroi was scattered across the world to prevent his return. The side effect of Shredder's defeat had sent Karai into the Twilight Realm, along with Shredder's sapience being sealed away. In the aftermath, Karai's remaining followers made it their sworn duty to watch over the armor pieces and never allow the Foot to reclaim them.

The Foot, allied with Baron Draxum, began collecting the armor pieces to resurrect him starting in "Shadow of Evil", with the Yōkai alchemist being promised of its dark power to protect his people from an ancient prophecy predicting the Yōkai's destruction.

In "Warren and Hypno, Sitting in a Tree", Draxum claimed the gauntlet in Warren Stone's possession that turned out to be part of the Kuroi Yōroi.

In "Operation: Normal", the Foot Brute and the Foot Recruit targeted the slime Yōkai, Sunita, because the boots she was wearing were part of the Kuroi Yōroi. They managed to claim them.

In "How to Make Enemies and Bend People to Your Will", Draxum and the Foot Recruit found out that a Kuroi Yōroi fragment was at the Botanical Gardens. They claimed it after setting up events where the Foot Lieutenant and the Foot Brute would fail. After obtaining the fragment, Draxum declared himself to be the Foot's leader, via exploiting a loophole in the clan's rulings of leadership. However, Draxum was completely oblivious to the fact that the Foot were just manipulating him into reviving their true leader, as they needed a being of great mystic power to don and energize the armor in order to resurrect Shredder (they were unaware that Shredder would not regain his sapience upon resurrection).

In "One Man's Junk", the next piece of the Kuroi Yōroi was in the possession of Repo Mantis, who claimed it from a Yōkai and held in his salvage yard. After trapping the cat/mantis mutant, Mrs. Nubbins who was owned by Repo Mantis, the Turtles learn that two fire-headed guys working as shoe salesmen bought the metal from him. This caused the Turtles to learn that the Foot Lieutenant and the Foot Brute claimed the metal.

After the Kuroi Yōroi was completed in "End Game", Draxum donned the armor, intent on destroying humanity once and for all in his misguided quest to protect the Yōkai. The Foot Lieutenant and the Foot Brute addressed him as Shredder, but he rejected the title, confused with the name "Shredder". Furthermore, due to a flaw in the armor (the Turtles' Jupiter Jim action figure was shoved in to cover a hole when the faceplate was used as a tea kettle), it was not able to properly absorb Draxum's power. After Draxum was defeated and spat out of the armor, due to April knocking a baseball against the action figure, it reassembled itself, having drained Draxum of his life force.

In "Many Happy Returns", Shredder acted like a feral beast, due to his sapience still being sealed in the Twilight Realm. During the chaos, a heavily weakened Draxum used his remaining strength to escape through a portal the Foot Recruit opened to assist her senses. After being attacked by the demon, the Foot Lieutenant, Foot Brute, and Foot Recruit retreated to find out what went wrong. After discovering a flux in Shredder's quantum energy, causing him to randomly phase in and out between Earth and the Twilight Realm, Big Mama was able to provide a mystic collar for the Turtles and Splinter to trap Shredder in another dimension, though she made a secret last-minute alteration to this plan.

In "Battle Nexus: New York," Big Mama secretly attached a control device and its associated magic ring to the Shredder and controlled him under the alias of Shadow Fiend. This was discovered during the Turtles, Splinter, April, and the redeemed and recovering Draxum's fight with Big Mama. When the ring was removed from Big Mama during the fight, the Foot Recruit claimed it. Before Leonardo could portal Big Mama out during their escape, she got cut off. The Foot Recruit, furious that her master was enslaved, ominously told Big Mama that she was about to lose everything and advised her to run. The Shredder then destroyed the Grand Nexus Hotel, flying out into the city with the Foot Recruit on his back.

Afterwards, the Foot Recruit tried to take the collar of the Shredder to no avail until the Turtles, seeking a way to defeat him, learned of a weapon in the Twilight Realm, who is actually Karai, and brought her back and Shredder regained his sapience in the process. The Shredder along with the Foot Recruit, the Foot Lieutenant and the Foot Brute, with the intent to destroy Karai and take her power for himself, attacked the Turtle's lair, with the lair destroyed and Karai defeated, the Turtles escaped with Todd while Splinter and Draxum remained behind to buy them time and got captured.

After Karai's death, Shredder did not claim her power, the Foot Lieutenant and the Foot Brute told him to extract Splinter's essence using Empyrean, the source of Yōkai power, Draxum offered him Empyrean and took them into his lab, however, this was a ruse as Draxum now realized that the Shredder was the threat to the Yōkai mentioned in the prophecy and tried to distract him and get away with Splinter but failed and forced to lead the Shredder to Empyrean. In the Crying Titan Shredder starts extracting Yoshi's essence with the Empyrean but Turtles arrive with their Hamato ninpo unlocked and Karai's spirit within April's body and fight him but are driven away, Shredder tries to absorb Yoshi's essence but Foot Recruit, having a change of heart, saves Splinter, the Turtles and Splinter with the help of their allies and the spirit of ancient Hamatos, destroy Shredder's armor and free Oroku Saki.

Films
The Shredder was played by James Saito in the first movie and by François Chau in the second, while his immense Super Shredder form was played by professional wrestler Kevin Nash. In all cases, the character was voiced by David McCharen. The Shredder's costume was, in the first movie, originally the same as in the original comic, with a red color. However, this was changed in the sequel to a violet color, reflecting the more cartoonish nature of the second film. In both movies, he also had a silver and black cape. In both films, he is served by his second-in-command Tatsu. In the Japanese versions, the Shredder is voiced by Norio Wakamoto (1st movie in VHS version), Hidekatsu Shibata (first movie in the TV version), and Takeshi Watabe (second movie).

Teenage Mutant Ninja Turtles (1990)

In the first movie Teenage Mutant Ninja Turtles, Oroku Saki and Hamato Yoshi were rival martial artists in Japan and both loved a woman named Tang Shen. Shen, who loved only Yoshi, persuaded him not to fight Saki honorably; instead, they fled for the United States. Saki followed them to New York City; when Yoshi returned home from his construction job he found his beloved Shen lying dead on the floor, he was ambushed and overpowered by Saki. Saki wasted no words and during the struggle, Splinter's cage was broken. Splinter leaped up onto Saki's face, biting and clawing, but the rogue ninja threw him to the floor and took one swipe with his katana, slicing Splinter's ear. After this incident, it was said that Saki is never heard from again. The comic book adaptation of the film retains the original comic book origin story, with Oroku Nagi being slain and Saki coming to America to seek vengeance.

Saki, in his "Shredder" persona, establishes an American branch of the Foot Clan. With the aid of his second-in-command Tatsu, he manipulates and recruits troubled teens as a brutal yet Machiavellian leader and father figure, teaching them ninjitsu to make them into skilled thieves and assassins. Shredder sends the Foot Clan to "silence" April O'Neil when she reports on the Foot Clan's connection to the recent crime wave, inadvertently leading them to the Turtles' hideout when Raphael saves April. Shredder had Splinter kidnapped and imprisoned him in his warehouse hideout, and has the Foot Clan hunt the Turtles. He beats Splinter while interrogating him about how the Turtles learned their fighting techniques.

After the Turtles successfully defeat the Foot Clan in a final assault, Shredder confronts them on a rooftop. He defeats all of the Turtles with his superior skills and threatens Leonardo with his yari to force the others to toss away their weapons. Splinter, freed by Turtles' allies, Danny Pennington and Casey Jones, intervenes and reveals to Shredder that they met years ago, as he was Hamato Yoshi's pet. Shredder unmasks himself, revealing the scars that Splinter gave him, and charges Splinter to impale him. Splinter counters with Michelangelo's nunchaku to send him over the side of the roof. Shredder throws a tanto at Splinter. Splinter caught the knife, but had to let go of the nunchaku that was holding onto the spear, making Shredder fall into a parked garbage truck far below. Casey Jones then activates the crushing mechanism; the viewers are then shown a closeup of Shredder's helmet being crushed, implying his death.

TMNT II: The Secret of the Ooze (1991)
In the second movie Teenage Mutant Ninja Turtles II: The Secret of the Ooze, the Shredder was played by François Chau, replacing Saito. In the film, the Turtles believe that since Casey had crushed him in the garbage truck, the Shredder was dead. It is soon revealed that Shredder had survived the crushing and revitalized his Foot Clan to get vengeance on the Turtles. After finding the Foot "fallback" headquarters in a junkyard, Tatsu was asking who would challenge him to cover for Shredder until Shredder appeared. Tatsu allowed Shredder to lead the Foot Clan. Shredder sent a member of the Foot to follow April, hoping to find the Turtles through her. When April's team was doing a report on T.G.R.I. in New Jersey, April's camera operator/Foot Clan member Freddy found some mutated dandelions and sent one to the Shredder. He then orders Tatsu to obtain a sample of the T.G.R.I. mutagen that mutated the Turtles, as well as kidnap researcher Jordan Perry. Using the last mutagen and Perry's research, the Shredder creates his own mutants, Tokka and Rahzar, from a stolen snapping turtle and a brown wolf respectively. Though initially enraged at their infant-like intelligence, he soon plays it to his advantage by manipulating the mutants as they imprinted him as their surrogate parent.

After a failed attempt to kill the Turtles in the junkyard using a captured Raphael, Shredder unleashed Tokka and Rahzar onto a city street to "have fun" and destroy it. The Foot spy then gave April a message for the Turtles: that the Shredder would turn the mutants loose on Central Park next if they did not accede to a rematch at the construction site. After the Turtles de-mutate the two mutants (with help from Perry) and defeat Tatsu in a nightclub, the Shredder appears and threatens to mutate an innocent woman with a small reserve mutagen vial (the canister was knocked away by the Turtles' new human ally, Keno). Before he can mutate her, he is stopped when the Turtles play a keytar at full volume, sending the Shredder flying through a window from the force of a blown speaker. When the Turtles follow him outside on a pier, they discover that the Shredder has used the mutagen vial on himself. He is transformed into a massive "Super Shredder", an almost mindless giant-mutant being with immense superhuman strength. During his fight with the Turtles, Super Shredder knocks down the pier's pilings in a mindless rage, which then collapses onto him with the Turtles falling into the water below. Though the Turtles survive, the Shredder meets his demise from getting crushed by the destroyed pieces of the pier.

Teenage Mutant Ninja Turtles III (1993) and TMNT (2007)
The Shredder did not appear in the third film but is shown briefly at the beginning of the fourth film to help give the backstory of the Turtles, and his helmet that he wore in the 1990 film is visible on Splinter's shelf of mementos at the end of the movie. The possibility of his return is also strongly hinted at the end of the film by Karai. However, the established storyline was abandoned in favor of the 2014 reboot.

Teenage Mutant Ninja Turtles (2014)
Japanese American actor Tohoru Masamune portrayed the Shredder in Teenage Mutant Ninja Turtles. Initially, William Fichtner was intended to portray a Caucasian version of the Shredder, with the anglicized real name of Eric Sacks, instead of Oroku Saki. This idea was abandoned late in production in favor of featuring a Shredder of authentic Japanese ancestry, and the film went through re-shoots to change Fichtner's character of Sacks into being the Shredder's student. The change came too late to alter the film's Nintendo 3DS tie-in video game, and Sacks remains the Shredder in it. In contrast to much of the brand's history, Sacks, not Shredder, is the character connected to the Turtles' origins, having created them alongside April O'Neil's father; the Shredder (never referred to with any name other than his codename) has no connection to Splinter or the Turtles, and while he is shown to have scars on his face, it is not revealed how he suffered them.

In the earliest stages of development for the film, Shredder was reimagined as "Colonel Schrader", the military leader of the black-ops unit "The Foot", revealed later in the script to be a yellow-skinned, red-eyed alien with the ability to sprout spikes. This idea was dropped after Evan Daugherty was hired to rewrite the script in early 2013.

In the film, Shredder is the leader of the Foot Clan, who is terrorizing New York City. After a vigilante stops the Foot Clan, Shredder orders the Foot to take hostages down the subway in order to lure the vigilante out. Later in the film, Shredder's adopted son, Eric Sacks, informs Shredder that the vigilante is in fact four mutated Turtles who are test subjects of Project Renaissance, a science experiment of April O'Neil's late father. Sacks give Shredder an armed suit and a helmet, the latter and the Foot Clan attack the Turtles' lair, where he defeats Splinter and kidnaps three Turtles after Raphael was presumed dead. Sacks drain the Turtles' blood in order to create mutagen so that he can complete his and Shredder's plan: the latter will release a virus across the city and Sacks will sell the mutagen as a cure for the disease, making him even richer. As Shredder prepares to release the virus, the Turtles escape and confront him. Although he nearly defeats them, the Turtles were able to conquer Shredder with the help of April, which causes him to fall from the building on which he stood, but he survives and is shown to have a sample of the mutagen.

Teenage Mutant Ninja Turtles: Out of the Shadows (2016)
Brian Tee portrayed Shredder in the 2016 film Teenage Mutant Ninja Turtles: Out of the Shadows. At the beginning of the movie, the Foot Clan, led by a scientist named Baxter Stockman, attempts to help Shredder escape from prison. Although the turtles try to prevent the escape, Stockman was able to help Shredder escape using a teleportation device. But Shredder is hijacked mid-teleport and ends up in a place called Dimension X. There, he meets Krang, who gives Shredder a mutagen canister in exchange for a promise to find the three components of a machine that Krang sent to Earth long ago, which when united will open a portal to his dimension. Shredder returns to New York City and recruits two criminals named Bebop and Rocksteady and has Stockman use Krang's mutagen to transform them into powerful animal mutants- a warthog and rhinoceros. Shredder, Bebop, and Rocksteady find the components in a museum in New York and in a jungle in Brazil. Shredder and Stockman unite the components, creating a portal to Krang's dimension. Shredder betrays Stockman and has his men take him away, but upon entering the Technodrome, Krang immediately betrays Shredder, freezing him and locking him away with his collection of other defeated foes. His fate following Krang's defeat is unknown.

Batman vs. Teenage Mutant Ninja Turtles
Andrew Kishino voices Shredder in the crossover animated film Batman vs. Teenage Mutant Ninja Turtles. In the film, Shredder allies his forces with Ra's al Ghul and the League of Assassins to build a machine designed to transform Gotham's citizens into unhinged mutants. In exchange for his assistance, Ra's promises Shredder access to one of his Lazarus Pits, which would grant him eternal life. When he and the Foot Clan try to steal a cloud seeder from Wayne Enterprises, he ends up fighting Batman and barely comes out victorious after using an ancient technique.

Later, he fights Batman once more when the Turtles and the Bat-Family arrive at Ace Chemicals to stop him and Ra's from activating the machine. Though he gains the upper hand on the Dark Knight once again, he is thrown off when Batman says "Cowabunga" and gains assistance from Raphael. Batman defeats Shredder in the fight. After Michaelangelo and Donatello destroy the machine, the debris sends him into a vat of chemicals as the plant explodes. In the post-credits scene, he is revealed to have survived the explosion and now strongly resembles the Joker.

Video games
As the original TMNT video games are mostly based on the 1987 cartoon, Shredder is often based on his first cartoon incarnation. He usually executes some plan to provoke the Turtles into retaliating and defeat them; these include kidnapping April O'Neil and stealing the Statue of Liberty. Shredder is usually the last boss in the games.
[[Teenage Mutant Ninja Turtles (NES game)|Teenage Mutant Ninja Turtles]] (NES, 1989): Shredder is the final boss. He is found at the end of the Technodrome level. He causes the Turtles to lose roughly half their energy if he touches them, and has a gun that can de-mutate them, which instantly kills them. He wears a red costume like in the Mirage comics.Teenage Mutant Ninja Turtles (arcade, 1989): Once again, Shredder is the final boss and is found at the end of the Technodrome level. He is armed with a sword, and has the ability to clone himself (the exact number of clones is one more than the number of Turtles attacking him in the arcade version). Shredder and his clones also have the ability to shoot lightning bolts from a device on the helmet, which de-mutate the Turtles they hit, killing them. When Shredder or one of his clones is close to death, his helmet falls off, a unique occurrence in the game series.Teenage Mutant Ninja Turtles: Fall of the Foot Clan (1990): This game was the first one not to feature Shredder as the final boss. Instead, Shredder is the boss of the penultimate stage, which is set in a river. It is also the first game in which Shredder does not have the ability to de-mutate the Turtles. His only attack is a sword swipe, but he can teleport if hit. The final boss is Krang.Teenage Mutant Ninja Turtles: The Manhattan Missions (1991): In this PC game, Shredder fights the turtles in his Manhattan hideout, decorated in a Japanese style. His appearance is based on the Mirage comic version.Teenage Mutant Ninja Turtles III: The Manhattan Project (1992): This game is the first to feature both a battle against Shredder and a second one against a mutated Super Shredder. The first battle takes place at the end of the Technodrome level, which is the sixth of the eight levels of the game. In this battle, Shredder uses a sword to attack the Turtles. Shredder later returns as the final boss of the game, on the stage set in Krang's spacecraft. This time, he mutates himself into Super Shredder, much as he did in the second movie which had been released earlier the same year (1991). Super Shredder has two superpowers, the ability to call down lightning, and the ability to shoot fireballs. These fireballs can de-mutate the Turtles, but unlike other games, this is not an instant kill.Teenage Mutant Ninja Turtles II: Back from the Sewers (1991): A sequel to Fall of the Foot Clan, this game also features Shredder as a regular level boss and Krang as the final boss. He does not have the ability to de-mutate the Turtles, but he does have a wider variety of attacks than in the previous Game Boy game. Shredder returns later in his mutated Super Shredder form, as a sub-level boss of the final Technodrome level. However, in this incarnation, his only super-power is the ability to teleport elsewhere on the screen. He attacks the Turtles using a sword.Teenage Mutant Ninja Turtles: Turtles in Time (1991): Shredder is again the final boss of the game, and found in the Technodrome. However, this time, he is not preceded by a Technodrome level. Instead, the Turtles fight through a Starbase level in the future (2100 AD) with Krang as boss, then teleport to the Technodrome in the present (1991 in the arcade game and 1992 in the SNES version) for the final confrontation. Shredder attacks with a sword, and can fire energy attacks. In the SNES port of the game, Shredder begins the battle by mutating himself into Super Shredder and has the added superpowers of super-speed movement, fire ground attacks, ice air attacks, and a de-mutating fireball which costs a turtle a life. The SNES port also added a Technodrome level earlier in the game, which leads to a battle with a regular Shredder. In this battle, Shredder is in a kind of battle tank, armed with a machine gun and claws. The player views the action over Shredder's shoulder inside the tank, and the only way to cause damage is to hurl the never-ending waves of Foot Soldiers toward the screen and into the tank.Teenage Mutant Ninja Turtles: The Hyperstone Heist (1992): This game uses a Super Shredder similar to the one in Turtles in Time. His attacks are roughly the same.Teenage Mutant Ninja Turtles III: Radical Rescue (1993): Unlike its two predecessors, Fall of the Foot Clan and Back from the Sewers, this game does feature Shredder as the final boss. However, this time Shredder has become Cyber Shredder, half-man, and half-machine. This form of Shredder possessed deadly kick moves and energy ball attacks, as well as being the only boss in the game with two life meters, as the meter instantly refills after it is drained the first time.Teenage Mutant Ninja Turtles: Tournament Fighters (1993): This is the first game in which Shredder is not a boss but instead a regular playable character. Furthermore, his costume is based on the Mirage comics version. Finally, in the SNES incarnation of this game, he appears under the name Cyber-Shredder, but there is no indication that he has become a cybernetic being as in Radical Rescue.

After a 10-year hiatus, a new series of TMNT games was initiated. These new games are based on the 2003 cartoon series, and likewise, Shredder in the games is the same as in the cartoon.Teenage Mutant Ninja Turtles (2003): Shredder appears as the final boss. The Turtles face him on the helicarrier at the top of the Foot Helicarriers; he wields the Sword of Tengu in this fight. Shredder's combo attacks are quick and nearly continuous. When half of his health bar has been depleted, his attacks become much faster. There is also a secret final boss in which the player faces Shredder as Oroku Saki. His combos are much quicker and deadlier, and he also has a temporary powered-up state.Teenage Mutant Ninja Turtles 2: Battle Nexus (2004): The game begins a short while before the end of the previous game, and Shredder is encountered by the Turtles in the second stage of the game; however, he is not fought by the player, only in a cutscene. As in the cartoon, Shredder is defeated, but he survives the assault on his headquarters. Shredder resurfaces in the TCRI building later on, but once again, the player does not directly fight him; the main goal of the mission being to evacuate the Utroms back to their home planet. He is seemingly killed in the destruction of the TCRI building, but he once again survives. In a subplot exclusive to the game, he is detailed as being a mass murderer of Utroms on their homeworld, and he gave Utrom mercenary Slashurr a permanent scar. He later wiped Slashurr's memory and employed him to kill the Turtles. However, Slashurr eventually remembers his past, and with the Turtles, battles Shredder and the Foot on his ship. The Turtles eventually defeat Shredder once again. In the Battle Nexus fighting tournament mode, Shredder appears as the final boss of the Foot Fight tournament, though the nature of these tournaments when it comes to the game's canon is questionable.Teenage Mutant Ninja Turtles: Mutant Melee (2005): Shredder appeared as a playable character and opponent in three forms—his standard armor, without the armor (as Oroku Saki), and a golden "Mega" Shredder.Teenage Mutant Ninja Turtles 3: Mutant Nightmare (2005) The third chapter of the game, "Exodus", deals directly with the Turtles thwarting the Foot's efforts. As in the third-season finale, the Turtles and Splinter battle the Foot at their headquarters, and follow the Shredder aboard his starship. They nearly sacrifice themselves to kill Shredder as well, but the Utroms rescue them, and exile Shredder to a distant ice asteroid forever. Shredder is also encountered in the dark future as one of the final bosses of the Nightmare chapter of the game.TMNT (2007): In the console versions of the 2007 movie-based game, Shredder appears as a boss in a flashback-within-a-flashback (as the events of the game are told to Splinter after their occurrence). The armor of Shredder in this game is based on the 2003 cartoon series version.TMNT: Smash Up (2009): Shredder is a playable character in the PS2 and Wii fighting game. He appears in both his Utrom Shredder and Cyber Shredder forms.Teenage Mutant Ninja Turtles: Out of the Shadows (2013): Shredder appears as both the penultimate and final boss of the game. He recruits Baxter Stockman to build a new helmet for him using stolen Krang technology, which gives him telekinetic powers, including the ability to fly. Shredder is first fought in his lair when the Turtles come to save April and learn about his scheme. After escaping, he has fought again in the Krangs' secret underground facility, this time donning his new helmet built by Stockman. He is ultimately defeated by the Turtles, who destroy his helmet, leaving him to swear revenge.Teenage Mutant Ninja Turtles (2014): The Nintendo 3DS game based on the 2014 film, Shredder, who is actually Eric Sacks, appears as the final boss. However, after defeating him, it is revealed that it was all an illusion created by Baxter Stockman, to allow the real Shredder to escape.Nickelodeon Kart Racers (2018): Shredder appears as a non-playable background character in the Teenage Mutant Ninja Turtles tracks, based on the 2012 incarnation.Nickelodeon Kart Racers 2: Grand Prix (2020): Shredder appears as a playable driver, once again based on his 2012 appearance.Nickelodeon All-Star Brawl (2021): Shredder appears as a playable character as part of a free update, based on his 1987 appearance.
Shredder appears as a boss in the 2022 beat-'em-up Teenage Mutant Ninja Turtles: Shredder's Revenge. He's first fought in his usual form, then appears again as the final boss as Super Shredder, a mutated, ultimate form affected by the mutagen.

Other appearances
In the anime adaptation Mutant Turtles: Choujin Densetsu-hen, the backstory from the original cartoon was preserved. Unlike the rest of the main cast, Shredder's appearance was changed to match the Supermutants Shredder toy that was being sold at that time. The manga explained this by saying his original outfit was destroyed in a battle with the Turtles and Krang created the new armor for him. Shredder also gains the ability to transform into the dragon Devil Shredder using the Mutanite crystals he stole from the Neutrinos. With the energy from the evil sprite Dark Mu, he was later able to transform into the gigantic Dark Devil Shredder. In the second volume of the anime, he gets his Tiger Spirit Metal Mutant armor. He was voiced by Kiyoyuki Yanada.

Shredder also made a guest appearance in an episode of the YouTube show Death Battle. In the episode, his weapons and abilities were analyzed against X-Men villain Silver Samurai. In the end, Shredder proved himself the better fighter and beat his opponent.

Shredder appears an operator for the KorTac faction in Call of Duty: Modern Warfare II.

In the Disney film Chip 'n Dale: Rescue Rangers'', an arm from the 1987 Shredder appears as one of the components in Sweet Pete's amalgated form. Jim Cummings, who was an understudy for Shredder in the 1987 series, briefly provides Sweet Pete's voice during his fight with Chip and Dale, credited as "Shredder Arm".

References

External links
 The Shredder profile on the official TMNT website

Extraterrestrial supervillains
Villains in animated television series
Comics characters introduced in 1984
Comics characters with superhuman strength
Comic martial artists
Fictional businesspeople
Fictional code names
Fictional crime bosses
Fictional dictators
Fictional fist-load fighters
Fictional immigrants to the United States
Fictional characters from Tokyo
Fictional characters with disfigurements
Fictional mass murderers
Fictional ninja
Fictional Ninjutsu practitioners
Fictional swordfighters in comics
Fictional warlords
Male characters in animated series
Male characters in comics
Male film villains
Film supervillains
Teenage Mutant Ninja Turtles characters
Television supervillains
Video game bosses
Fictional martial arts trainers
Fictional prison escapees
Fictional kidnappers
Fictional demons and devils
Fictional terrorists
Fictional Japanese people
Fighting game characters
Supervillains with their own comic book titles